Plochionus amandus is a species of ground beetle in the family Carabidae. It is found in North America.

Subspecies
These three subspecies belong to the species Plochionus amandus:
 Plochionus amandus amandus Newman, 1840
 Plochionus amandus discoideus LeConte, 1880
 Plochionus amandus vittatus LeConte, 1844

References

Further reading

 

Harpalinae
Articles created by Qbugbot
Beetles described in 1840